Carrot red leaf virus (CtRLV) is a plant pathogenic virus of the family Solemoviridae.

External links
ICTVdB - The Universal Virus Database: Carrot red leaf virus
Family Groups - The Baltimore Method

Viral plant pathogens and diseases